William Larkins (died 24 April 1800) was a member of the Royal Society elected 14 April 1796

He was an accountant in Bengal for the British East India Company.

References

Fellows of the Royal Society
Year of birth missing
1800 deaths
British accountants